Pabarsa, Commonly known as Baparsa Or Pawarsa is a sub-urban  village near "Sardar Vallabh Bhai Patel Agriculture & Technology University, Modipuram (Meerut) having population of 2500 inhabitants. It is located at  approximation of 750 meters from Main University Campus. Urban centre (Modipuram) of Meerut metropolitan city & Daurala nagar panchayat of Meerut district are very near to village  approx 3.5 Kilometres in south east & north east directions respectively.

It is also very close to under construction "Modipuram depot station" of Delhi Meerut RRTS ( Rapid metro). Agriculture is main occupations of villagers , especially farming of Sugar cane , Wheat, Rice & Potato.

Villages in Meerut district